"Life's Too Long (To Live Like This)" is a song written by Lonnie Wilson, John Barlow Jarvis and Don Cook, and recorded by American country music artist Ricky Skaggs.  It was released in August 1991 as the first single from the album My Father's Son.  The song reached #37 on the Billboard Hot Country Singles & Tracks chart.

Chart performance

References

1991 singles
Ricky Skaggs songs
Songs written by Don Cook
Songs written by John Barlow Jarvis
Songs written by Lonnie Wilson
Song recordings produced by Ricky Skaggs
Epic Records singles
1991 songs